Braniștea is a commune in Dâmbovița County, Muntenia, Romania. It is composed of three villages: Braniștea, Dâmbovicioara and Săvești.

Natives
 Sorin Paliga
 Niculae M. Popescu

References

Communes in Dâmbovița County
Localities in Muntenia